The fourth season of Malcolm in the Middle premiered on November 3, 2002, on Fox, and ended on May 18, 2003, with a total of 22 episodes. Frankie Muniz stars as the title character Malcolm, and he is joined by Jane Kaczmarek, Bryan Cranston, Christopher Kennedy Masterson, Justin Berfield and Erik Per Sullivan.

Episodes

Cast and characters

Main 
 Frankie Muniz as Malcolm
 Jane Kaczmarek as Lois
 Bryan Cranston as Hal
 Christopher Kennedy Masterson as Francis
 Justin Berfield as Reese
 Erik Per Sullivan as Dewey

Recurring 
 Kenneth Mars as Otto
 Emy Coligado as Piama
 David Anthony Higgins as Craig Feldspar
 Craig Lamar Traylor as Stevie Kenarban
 Reagan Dale Neis as Nikki
 Evan Matthew Cohen as Lloyd
 Cloris Leachman as Ida
 Katherine Ellis as Gretchen
 Kyle Sullivan as Dabney
 Brittany Finamore as Alison

Production 
Main cast members Frankie Muniz, Jane Kaczmarek, Bryan Cranston, Christopher Kennedy Masterson, Justin Berfield and Erik Per Sullivan return as Malcolm, Lois, Hal, Francis, Reese and Dewey respectively. The season introduces Jamie, the fifth child of Hal and Lois, although the baby's gender would not be revealed until the fifth season. The series' parallel storylines involving Francis shifts in this season from the previous season's Alaska to a cattle ranch. The storyline of "If Boys Were Girls" was developed by costume designer Heidi Kaczenski's then 11-year old niece Alexandra. Since Kaczmarek was pregnant before the season began filming, she was written out of some episodes, while her pregnancy was incorporated into the story later in the season. The episode "Clip Show 2" is the series' second clip show after the third season's 19th episode.

Release

Broadcast history 
The season premiered on November 3, 2002 on Fox, and ended on May 18, 2003 with a total of 22 episodes. According to Ned Martel of The New York Times, showrunner Linwood Boomer "chose to take a hard look at Malcolm's adolescence. That and a later time slot meant a 19 percent decline in the key demographic of viewers 18 to 49 in its fourth season's ratings."

Home media 
The season was released on Region 2 DVD on March 4, 2013, and on Region 4 DVD on September 4, 2013.

Reception 
Mark Sachs of Los Angeles Times said on May 10, 2003, "This well-written, solidly performed series is as close to a live-action cartoon as you can get, and when it’s clicking on all cylinders as in Sunday’s episode, it’s a joy to behold." At the 55th Primetime Emmy Awards, "If Boys Were Girls" won in the category Outstanding Single Camera Picture Editing for a Comedy Series, while Kaczmarek and Cranston received nominations for Outstanding Lead Actress In A Comedy Series and Outstanding Supporting Actor In A Comedy Series respectively. Cloris Leachman, who portrays Lois' mother Ida, won in the category Outstanding Guest Actress In A Comedy Series.

References 

2002 American television seasons
2003 American television seasons
Malcolm in the Middle